Spintronics (a portmanteau meaning spin transport electronics), also known as spin electronics, is the study of the intrinsic spin of the electron and its associated magnetic moment, in addition to its fundamental electronic charge, in solid-state devices. The field of spintronics concerns spin-charge coupling in metallic systems; the analogous effects in insulators fall into the field of multiferroics.

Spintronics fundamentally differs from traditional electronics in that, in addition to charge state, electron spins are used as a further degree of freedom, with implications in the efficiency of data storage and transfer. Spintronic systems are most often realised in dilute magnetic semiconductors (DMS) and Heusler alloys and are of particular interest in the field of quantum computing and neuromorphic computing.

History
Spintronics emerged from discoveries in the 1980s concerning spin-dependent electron transport phenomena in solid-state devices. This includes the observation of spin-polarized electron injection from a ferromagnetic metal to a normal metal by Johnson and Silsbee (1985) and the discovery of giant magnetoresistance independently by Albert Fert et al. and Peter Grünberg et al. (1988). The origin of spintronics can be traced to the ferromagnet/superconductor tunneling experiments pioneered by Meservey and Tedrow and initial experiments on magnetic tunnel junctions by Julliere in the 1970s. The use of semiconductors for spintronics began with the theoretical proposal of a spin field-effect-transistor by Datta and Das in 1990 and of the electric dipole spin resonance by Rashba in 1960.

Theory 

The spin of the electron is an intrinsic angular momentum that is separate from the angular momentum due to its orbital motion. Like orbital angular momentum, the spin has an associated magnetic moment, the magnitude of which is expressed as

.

In a solid, the spins of many electrons can act together to affect the magnetic and electronic properties of a material, for example endowing it with a permanent magnetic moment as in a ferromagnet.

In many materials, electron spins are equally present in both the up and the down state, and no transport properties are dependent on spin. A spintronic device requires generation or manipulation of a spin-polarized population of electrons, resulting in an excess of spin up or spin down electrons. The polarization of any spin dependent property X can be written as

.

A net spin polarization can be achieved either through creating an equilibrium energy split between spin up and spin down. Methods include putting a material in a large magnetic field (Zeeman effect), the exchange energy present in a ferromagnet or forcing the system out of equilibrium. The period of time that such a non-equilibrium population can be maintained is known as the spin lifetime, .

In a diffusive conductor, a spin diffusion length  can be defined as the distance over which a non-equilibrium spin population can propagate. Spin lifetimes of conduction electrons in metals are relatively short (typically less than 1 nanosecond). An important research area is devoted to extending this lifetime to technologically relevant timescales.

The mechanisms of decay for a spin polarized population can be broadly classified as spin-flip scattering and spin dephasing. Spin-flip scattering is a process inside a solid that does not conserve spin, and can therefore switch an incoming spin up state into an outgoing spin down state. Spin dephasing is the process wherein a population of electrons with a common spin state becomes less polarized over time due to different rates of electron spin precession. In confined structures, spin dephasing can be suppressed, leading to spin lifetimes of milliseconds in semiconductor quantum dots at low temperatures.

Superconductors can enhance central effects in spintronics such as magnetoresistance effects, spin lifetimes and dissipationless spin-currents.

The simplest method of generating a spin-polarised current in a metal is to pass the current through a ferromagnetic material. The most common applications of this effect involve giant magnetoresistance (GMR) devices. A typical GMR device consists of at least two layers of ferromagnetic materials separated by a spacer layer. When the two magnetization vectors of the ferromagnetic layers are aligned, the electrical resistance will be lower (so a higher current flows at constant voltage) than if the ferromagnetic layers are anti-aligned. This constitutes a magnetic field sensor.

Two variants of GMR have been applied in devices: (1) current-in-plane (CIP), where the electric current flows parallel to the layers and (2) current-perpendicular-to-plane (CPP), where the electric current flows in a direction perpendicular to the layers.

Other metal-based spintronics devices:
 Tunnel magnetoresistance (TMR), where CPP transport is achieved by using quantum-mechanical tunneling of electrons through a thin insulator separating ferromagnetic layers.
 Spin-transfer torque, where a current of spin-polarized electrons is used to control the magnetization direction of ferromagnetic electrodes in the device.
 Spin-wave logic devices carry information in the phase. Interference and spin-wave scattering can perform logic operations.

Spintronic-logic devices
Non-volatile spin-logic devices to enable scaling are being extensively studied. Spin-transfer, torque-based logic devices that use spins and magnets for information processing have been proposed. These devices are part of the ITRS exploratory road map. Logic-in memory applications are already in the development stage. A 2017 review article can be found in Materials Today.

A generalized circuit theory for spintronic integrated circuits has been proposed  so that the physics of spin transport can be utilized by SPICE developers and subsequently by circuit and system designers for the exploration of spintronics for “beyond CMOS computing.”

Applications
Read heads of magnetic hard drives are based on the GMR or TMR effect.

Motorola developed a first-generation 256 kb magnetoresistive random-access memory (MRAM) based on a single magnetic tunnel junction and a single transistor that has a read/write cycle of under 50 nanoseconds. Everspin has since developed a 4 Mb version. Two second-generation MRAM techniques are in development: thermal-assisted switching (TAS) and spin-transfer torque (STT).

Another design, racetrack memory, encodes information in the direction of magnetization between domain walls of a ferromagnetic wire.

In 2012, persistent spin helices of synchronized electrons were made to persist for more than a nanosecond, a 30-fold increase over earlier efforts, and longer than the duration of a modern processor clock cycle.

Semiconductor-based spintronic devices

Doped semiconductor materials display dilute ferromagnetism. In recent years, dilute magnetic oxides (DMOs) including ZnO based DMOs and TiO2-based DMOs have been the subject of numerous experimental and computational investigations. Non-oxide ferromagnetic semiconductor sources (like manganese-doped gallium arsenide ), increase the interface resistance with a tunnel barrier, or using hot-electron injection.

Spin detection in semiconductors has been addressed with multiple techniques:
 Faraday/Kerr rotation of transmitted/reflected photons
 Circular polarization analysis of electroluminescence
 Nonlocal spin valve (adapted from Johnson and Silsbee's work with metals)
 Ballistic spin filtering

The latter technique was used to overcome the lack of spin-orbit interaction and materials issues to achieve spin transport in silicon.

Because external magnetic fields (and stray fields from magnetic contacts) can cause large Hall effects and magnetoresistance in semiconductors (which mimic spin-valve effects), the only conclusive evidence of spin transport in semiconductors is demonstration of spin precession and dephasing in a magnetic field non-collinear to the injected spin orientation, called the Hanle effect.

Applications
Applications using spin-polarized electrical injection have shown threshold current reduction and controllable circularly polarized coherent light output. Examples include semiconductor lasers. Future applications may include a spin-based transistor having advantages over MOSFET devices such as steeper sub-threshold slope. 

Magnetic-tunnel transistor: The magnetic-tunnel transistor with a single base layer has the following terminals:
 Emitter (FM1): Injects spin-polarized hot electrons into the base.
 Base (FM2): Spin-dependent scattering takes place in the base. It also serves as a spin filter.
 Collector (GaAs): A Schottky barrier is formed at the interface. It only collects electrons that have enough energy to overcome the Schottky barrier, and when states are available in the semiconductor.

The magnetocurrent (MC) is given as:

And the transfer ratio (TR) is

MTT promises a highly spin-polarized electron source at room temperature.

Storage media 
Antiferromagnetic storage media have been studied as an alternative to ferromagnetism, especially since with antiferromagnetic material the bits can be stored as well as with ferromagnetic material. Instead of the usual definition 0 ↔ 'magnetisation upwards', 1 ↔ 'magnetisation downwards', the states can be, e.g., 0 ↔ 'vertically-alternating spin configuration' and 1 ↔ 'horizontally-alternating spin configuration'.).

The main advantages of antiferromagnetic material are:

 insensitivity to data-damaging perturbations by stray fields due to zero net external magnetization;
 no effect on near particles, implying that antiferromagnetic device elements would not magnetically disturb its neighboring elements;
 far shorter switching times (antiferromagnetic resonance frequency is in the THz range compared to GHz ferromagnetic resonance frequency);
 broad range of commonly available antiferromagnetic materials including insulators, semiconductors, semimetals, metals, and superconductors.

Research is being done into how to read and write information to antiferromagnetic spintronics as their net zero magnetization makes this difficult compared to conventional ferromagnetic spintronics. In modern MRAM, detection and manipulation of ferromagnetic order by magnetic fields has largely been abandoned in favor of more efficient and scalable reading and writing by electrical current. Methods of reading and writing information by current rather than fields are also being investigated in antiferromagnets as fields are ineffective anyway. Writing methods currently being investigated in antiferromagnets are through spin-transfer torque and spin-orbit torque from the spin Hall effect and the Rashba effect. Reading information in antiferromagnets via magnetoresistance effects such as tunnel magnetoresistance is also being explored.

See also 
 Electric dipole spin resonance
 Josephson effect
 Magnetoresistive random-access memory (MRAM)
 Magnonics
 Potential applications of graphene#Spintronics
 Rashba effect
 Spin pumping
 Spin-transfer torque
 Spinhenge@Home
 Spinmechatronics
 Spinplasmonics
 Unconventional computing
 Valleytronics
 List of emerging technologies
Multiferroics

References

Further reading 
 "Introduction to Spintronics". Marc Cahay, Supriyo Bandyopadhyay, CRC Press, 
 
 
 
 
 
 
 "Spintronics Steps Forward.", University of South Florida News

External links
 23 milestones in the history of spin compiled by Nature
 Milestone 18: A Giant Leap for Electronics: Giant Magneto-resistance, compiled by Nature
 Milestone 20: Information in a Spin: Datta-Das, compiled by Nature
 
 Spintronics portal with news and resources
 RaceTrack:InformationWeek (April 11, 2008) 
 Spintronics research targets GaAs.
 Spintronics Tutorial 
 Lecture on Spin transport by S. Datta (from Datta Das transistor)—Part 1 and Part 2

 
Emerging technologies
Theoretical computer science